Somma Lombardo is a town in the province of Varese, Lombardy, Italy. It received the honorary title of city with a presidential decree on 16 June 1959.

Industry
The airline Neos has its head office in the city.

History
The town was strategically located on the consular Roman road, passing from the town of Sesto Calende and linking Milan to Verbano.

In medieval times, the city was under the jurisdiction of the nearby town of Arsago Seprio, an important political centre of the region.

In the forest around Somma, various vestiges of trenches and landing strips dating back to the Second World War can still be found.

People 
Giuseppina Aliverti (1894–1982), geophysicist remembered for developing the Aliverti-Lovera method of measuring the radioactivity of water
 Niccolò Sfondrati, Pope Gregory XIV
 Valerio Valeri, anthropologist

References

External links

Official site of Somma Lombardo Municipality  
The Visconti Castle - Somma Lombardo